D. Darryl Hudson (born 1982 in Lethbridge, Alberta) is a Canadian scientist and musician based in Alberta, who specializes in the breeding, cultivation, extraction and formulation of Cannabis (drug). Hudson was awarded the Alexander Graham Bell Canada graduate scholarship and the first Mitacs Industrial post-doctoral fellowship award and received his PhD in molecular biology and genetics from Guelph University in 2010 specializing in genetic engineering of crop plants. Dr. Hudson also performs studies and clinical research on psilocybin (magic mushrooms), and is the co-founder of GoodCap Pharmaceuticals, a psychedelic pharmaceutical company based in Canada. 

Hudson is an expert in cannabis and fungi and has contributed to groundbreaking studies of the genetics of Cannabis. Actively breeding hemp crops in Canada and abroad, Hudson has pioneered plant and natural extraction protocols focusing on efficient and safe methods for removal and separation of medical molecules.

Hudson has been active in studying effects of Cannabis and fungi in treating post traumatic stress disorder (PTSD) specifically working with military veterans to develop both medications and protocols.< Hudson spoke to the US Senate, prior to the groundbreaking legislation that allowed US veterans to receive recommendations for medical marijuana. He continues to speak at many international conferences.

Hudson is also co-author of numerous peer-reviewed scientific publications and research articles, on plant biology, plant genetics, DNA repair, epigenetics, cancer and Cannabis.
He is the founder of InPlanta Biotechnology and Pathways Rx, and continues to operate a lab in Canada focusing on Cannabis plant and its interactions with humans.

References

1982 births
Living people
University of Guelph alumni
Canadian molecular biologists
Canadian geneticists
Scientists from Lethbridge
21st-century Canadian biologists